The Hong Kong National Time Trial Championships are held annually to decide the cycling champions in the time trial discipline, across various categories.

Men

Women

References

National road cycling championships
Cycle races in Hong Kong